Yanagi is a Japanese surname. Notable people with the surname include:

Kotaro Yanagi (born 1985), Japanese actor
Masako Yanagi (born 1959), Japanese tennis player
Miwa Yanagi (born 1967), Japanese photographer
Nagi Yanagi (born 1987), Japanese singer
Naoki Yanagi (born 1972), Japanese voice actor
Yanagi Sōetsu (1889–1961), Japanese philosopher
Sori Yanagi (1915–2011), Japanese designer
Yūrei Yanagi (born 1963), Japanese actor

Japanese-language surnames